Eric Joyce may refer to:

Eric Joyce, husband of Day Joyce (née Sage, 1905-1975) who created the secret diary Day Joyce Sheet during the Pacific War
Eric Joyce (born 1960), British politician
Eric Joyce (American football) (born 1978), defensive back
Eric Joyce (footballer) (1924–1977), English footballer